The 2015 Liberal Democrats leadership election was held on 16 July 2015 following the resignation of Nick Clegg as leader on 8 May 2015, after almost eight years as leader of the Liberal Democrats, following the party's poor performance at the 2015 general election.

The result was announced on 16 July 2015 with Tim Farron winning by a margin of 13%.

Background 
In the 2015 general election, the Liberal Democrats lost 49 seats, reducing the party to eight seats in the House of Commons.

Many prominent party leaders and veteran MPs lost bids for re-election, including Chief Secretary to the Treasury Danny Alexander; Business Secretary and former interim leader Vince Cable; Energy and Climate Change Secretary Ed Davey; Charles Kennedy, who had been party leader from 1999 to 2006 and had been a member of Parliament for 32 years; and former deputy party leader Simon Hughes, who had also served in Parliament for 32 years. Individuals who had served as ministers Jo Swinson, Lynne Featherstone, Paul Burstow and Jenny Willott were also among the Lib Dem MPs who lost their seats.

Nick Clegg, the party's leader and Deputy Prime Minister in the Conservative-Lib Dem coalition government of 2010 to 2015, was re-elected in his Sheffield constituency, but resigned as party leader the morning after the election. In an emotional speech, he stated: "I must take responsibility and therefore I announce that I will be resigning as leader of the Liberal Democrats."

Under the rules of the Liberal Democrat parliamentary party, the Deputy Leader of the Liberal Democrats serves as an interim leader for the Liberal Democrats until a new leader can be elected. However, this position had been vacant since the election due to the retirement of Malcolm Bruce. The party president, Sal Brinton, a member of the House of Lords, was the de facto interim leader.

Following the election, the party experienced a surge in membership; 61,000 party members were entitled to vote, including over 16,500 new members who had joined before the close of nominations for the leadership.

Election rules
The timetable for a leadership election was determined by the party's Federal Executive, under Article 10.4 of the Liberal Democrat constitution, and a meeting was held to discuss this on 9 May 2015.

Liberal Democrat leadership elections use the alternative vote (instant-runoff) system, the single-winner version of the single transferable vote. However, as only two candidates stood, it effectively became a simple plurality vote with all Liberal Democrat party members being entitled to vote under a "one member, one vote"  system.

Article 10.5 of the Liberal Democrat constitution requires that any candidate wishing to stand must be a Member of Parliament and must have the support of:
 "at least ten percent of other members of the Parliamentary Party in the House of Commons" (i.e. one other MP at present); and
 "[be] supported by 200 members in aggregate in not less than 20 Local Parties"

The election itself was overseen by Electoral Reform Services, the commercial arm of the Electoral Reform Society.

Timeline

Candidates

Declined 
 Tom Brake, former Deputy Leader of the House of Commons and MP for Carshalton and Wallington
 Alistair Carmichael, Deputy Leader of the Scottish Liberal Democrats, former Secretary of State for Scotland and MP for Orkney and Shetland
 Greg Mulholland, MP for Leeds North West
 John Pugh, MP for Southport
 Mark Williams, MP for Ceredigion

Declared

Other endorsements

Tim Farron

 Peers: Lord Carlile, Lord Cotter, Lady Hussein-Ece, Lord Macdonald of River Glaven,  Baroness Maddock (former President of the Liberal Democrats), Lord Palmer of Childs Hill, Lord Palumbo, Lord Paddick, Lord Steel (former Leader of the Liberal Party), Lord Strasburger, Lord Taylor of Goss Moor.
 MSPs:  Jim Hume MSP, Willie Rennie MSP (Leader of the Scottish Liberal Democrats).
 Welsh AMs: Peter Black AM, William Powell AM, Kirsty Williams AM (Leader of the Welsh Liberal Democrats).
 London AMs: Stephen Knight AM.
 Former MPs: Sir Alan Beith (former Deputy Leader of the Liberal Democrats), Duncan Hames, Martin Horwood,  David Howarth, Simon Hughes (former Deputy Leader of the Liberal Democrats), Paul Keetch, John Leech, Jo Swinson, Sarah Teather.
 Former MEPs: Fiona Hall.
 Others: The Guardian, The Independent, New Statesman.

Norman Lamb
 Peers: Lord Addington, Lord Ashdown of Norton-sub-Hamdon, Baroness Barker, Baroness Bonham-Carter, Baroness Doocey, Lady Falkner, Baroness Garden, Baroness Grender, Baroness Hamwee, Baroness Jolly, Baroness Kramer, Baroness Ludford, Baroness Northover, Baroness Parminter, Baroness Suttie, Lord Tyler, Baroness Walmsley, Baroness Williams of Crosby
 Former MPs: Norman Baker, Paul Burstow, Ming Campbell (former Leader of the Liberal Democrats), Ed Davey, Lynne Featherstone, Sandra Gidley, Julia Goldsworthy, David Heath,  John Hemming, Julian Huppert, Michael Moore (former Secretary of State for Scotland), Tessa Munt, David Laws, Sir Bob Russell, Mike Thornton, Stephen Williams, Jenny Willott Simon Wright.
 Former MEPs: Andrew Duff.
 Welsh AMs: Eluned Parrott
 Others: Frank Bruno (former boxer), Dappy (musician), The Economist.

Polling and surveys 

A survey by LibDemVoice.org of self-selecting 1065 members out of 1900+ registered on the forum (out of a total party membership of 57,773) showed Tim Farron on 71%, with 29% preferring Norman Lamb for leader. LibDemVoice do not claim that their survey is representative of the total party membership but they claim they "are the largest independent samples of the views of Lib Dem members across the country, and have in the past offered accurate guides to what party members think."

On the day the results were due, Farron was the bookmakers' favourite.

Campaign 
Farron was seen as the candidate of the left of the party, while Lamb was seen as representing the politics of the party's prior involvement in coalition government, although others have argued the candidates' policy differences were minor.

Farron's religious beliefs and voting record on abortion and gay rights came under scrutiny. Lamb suspended two members of his campaign team over a survey of party members that broke party rules that highlighted views the Lamb campaign consider "illiberal".

In comments during the campaign, Tim Farron made reference to rebranding the party, but emphasised that in his view this needed to be more substantial than a simple superficial change: "I think rebranding ourselves, repositioning ourselves is very important. We've got to be absolutely radical about that but 18 months of a constitutional wrangle as we Tipp-Ex out a couple of words and add in another one in the constitution strikes me as a bit of a waste of time."

During the campaign Tim Farron was asked what role former Chief Executive, Chris Rennard, would have under his leadership. He replied, "I have no intention of appointing him to any role in the party."

Questions and answers put to the candidates 
 ALTER
 ALDES
 Daisy Cooper
 Green Liberal Democrats
 Liberal Reform
 Libdems for Seekers of Sanctuary
 Foreign Policy, via Libdem Voice
 Liberal Democrat Lawyers

Result

See also 
 2017 Liberal Democrats deputy leadership election
 2015 Labour Party leadership election (UK)

References 

Leadership election 2015
Liberal Democrats leadership election
Liberal Democrats leadership election